Ten Thousand Bars – Live is the eleventh album, and the fourth live album, by Ezio, recorded live at Kaiserthermen in Trier, Germany on 16 September 2007 and released in 2008.

Track listing

All songs written by Ezio Lunedei.

"Ten thousand bars" – 4.52
"Hotel motel" – 3.48
"Holding you now" – 4.37
"You're strange" – 4.53
"Shadow boxers"  - 6.11
"Thirty and confused" – 4:23
"Accordion girl" – 5.46
"The wild side" – 4.36
"Moon" – 5.34
"Braver than you are" – 5.05
"Higher" – 3.46
"Friends again" – 5:18
"Woo hoo hoo" – 5:18
"Maybe sometimes / Tupelo honey" – 5:18
"Meet me in the gods" – 5:18

See also
2008 in music

Ezio (band) albums
2008 live albums
Tapete Records albums